Nicklas Lars Carlsson (born 13 November 1979 in Stockholm, Sweden) is a retired Swedish footballer who played as a defender. His last club was IF Brommapojkarna.

Career
He started out his career at local outfit IF Brommapojkarna before moving to Delsbo with his family at age 5. A few years later he returned to his native club with which he pursued a career taking him from the youth ranks all the way up to the senior team.

In 2003, he left for Danish Superliga side AGF. He became a regular there until the winter of 2004/2005 when he told his adviser he wanted to leave. His stated desire was to play for his father's old team and in March 2005 he signed a three-year contract.

He quickly became a regular for the relegated 10-times Swedish champions as a central defender. But he also became joint second top scorer in the team for the 2005 season by scoring seven goals. Many came through set-pieces with Carlsson's ability to score with his head proving a deciding factor.

Nicklas Carlsson scored both goals in the 2–1 win against Västerås SK on 3 October 2005, a win which earned AIK an Allsvenskan berth for the 2006 campaign. Carlsson is now a successful part of the 2006 squad which is within reach of claiming a shock 11th championship title.

During the 2007 season AIK announced they will not offer Nicklas a new contract, which went out after the season. And on 31 October he signed a three-year deal with Gothenburg side IFK Göteborg. 2010 his contract with IFK Göteborg ended and did not get renewed. On 1 December 2010 he signed a contract for his first club IF Brommapojkarna. He retired on 5 November 2012.

References

External links

Elite Prospects profile

1979 births
Living people
Swedish expatriate footballers
Swedish footballers
Allsvenskan players
Danish Superliga players
IF Brommapojkarna players
Aarhus Gymnastikforening players
AIK Fotboll players
IFK Göteborg players
Expatriate men's footballers in Denmark
Swedish expatriate sportspeople in Denmark
Association football defenders
Footballers from Stockholm